The  National Football League season resulted in a tie for the Western Conference championship between the Detroit Lions and San Francisco 49ers. Both finished at 8–4 and had split their two games during the regular season in November, with the home team winning each.

The tie thus required a one-game playoff to be held between the two teams. This conference championship game was played on December 22 at Kezar Stadium in San Francisco, and Detroit won, 31–27.

The Lions moved on to host the Cleveland Browns on December 29 in the championship game, and won in a 59–14 rout at Briggs Stadium for their third title in six years. Through , it is Detroit's most recent league title, and second-most recent victory in a postseason game.

Tournament bracket

Western Conference championship

The Lions trailed the 49ers 24–7 at halftime, and were down twenty points in the third quarter. Quarterback Bobby Layne had been lost for the season two weeks earlier, and backup Tobin Rote lead the Lions' rally, scoring 24 unanswered points in the second half to win, 31–27. The game was featured on NFL Top 10 as #2 on Top Ten Comebacks. As of 2021, this is the last time the Lions have won a playoff game on the road.

NFL Championship game

References

1957
Playoffs